Polls may not add up to 120 seats due to rounding or omitted parties that dropped out or did not poll consistently.

Polling

By party 

Notes

Hypothetical polling
The following table contains polls if Tzipi Livni had been leader of Kadima.

For prime minister 
Incumbent Prime Minister Benjamin Nentanyahu has maintained a healthy plurality lead in every poll to date.

Hypothetical polling
The following table contains polls if Tzipi Livni had been leader of Kadima.

See also 
 2013 Israeli legislative election

References

Politics of Israel
Israel
Opinion polling in Israel